Heteropoda squamacea is a species of huntsman spider found in China, described by J. F. Wang in 1990.  The species has been erroneously synonymized with Heteropoda venatoria.

See also 
 List of Sparassidae species

References 

Sparassidae
Spiders of China
Spiders described in 1990